Men's trap shooting was one of the fifteen shooting events at the 1996 Summer Olympics. It was held on 20 and 21 July 1996 at the Wolf Creek Shooting Complex. there were 58 competitors from 41 nations, with each nation having up to three shooters. Michael Diamond of Australia won, setting two new Olympic records, ahead of two Americans. After the regular 150 targets, it took a marathon shoot-off to separate the silver and bronze medalists; after both shooters had hit 27 straight targets, Josh Lakatos hit his 28th while Lance Bade missed. It was the first medal in the men's trap for Australia; the United States had most recently been on the podium in the event in 1984.

Background
This was the 17th appearance of the men's ISSF Olympic trap event. The event was held at every Summer Olympics from 1896 to 1924 (except 1904, when no shooting events were held) and from 1952 to 2016. As with most shooting events, it was nominally open to women from 1968 to 1980; the trap remained open to women through 1992. Very few women participated these years. The event returned to being men-only for 1996, though the new double trap had separate events for men and women that year. In 2000, a separate women's event was added and it has been contested at every Games since. There was also a men's team trap event held four times from 1908 to 1924.

Three of the 6 finalists from the 1992 Games returned: bronze medalist Marco Venturini of Italy, fourth-place finisher Jörg Damme of Germany, and fifth-place finisher Pavel Kubec of Czechoslovakia (now competing for the Czech Republic). Venturini had won his third World Championship in 1993. Dmitry Monakov, Olympic champion in 1988 for the Soviet Union, returned for Ukraine; he was the 1994 World Champion. The reigning (1995) World Champion was Giovanni Pellielo of Italy.

Angola, Chinese Taipei, the Czech Republic, New Zealand, North Korea, Slovakia, and Ukraine each made their debut in the event. Great Britain made its 16th appearance, most among nations, having missed only the 1980 Moscow Games.

Competition format
The competition used a new, two-round format, dropping the three-round format from 1988 and 1992. The qualifying round was reduced to 125 targets (in 5 series of 25, held over two days with 3 series the first day and 2 series the second). The semifinal round was eliminated. The top six shooters advanced to the final. The final remained a single series of 25 targets; the total score over all 6 series (150 targets) determined the winner. Shoot-offs were used as necessary to break ties for qualifying for the final and in the final.

Records
Prior to this competition, the existing world and Olympic records were as follows.

Michael Diamond set the initial Olympic records for the qualifying round (125-target) at 124 and for the 150-target combined score at 149.

Schedule

Results

Qualifying round

Final

References

Sources

Shooting at the 1996 Summer Olympics
Trap at the Olympics
Men's events at the 1996 Summer Olympics